Untied may refer to:
 Untied.com, a website critical of United Airlines
 Untied (album), an album by The Ten Tenors

See also
 United (disambiguation)
 Untied aid, assistance funds which are not limited to being spent on goods and services from specified countries